Colla lilacina is a moth in the Bombycidae family. It was described by Paul Dognin in 1916. It is found in French Guiana.

References

Natural History Museum Lepidoptera generic names catalog

Bombycidae
Moths described in 1916